Bryshear Barnett "Brock" Davis (born October 19, 1943) is an American former Major League Baseball outfielder whose professional career, including minor league service, lasted for 13 seasons (1963–1975). Davis was born in Oakland, California and attended John C. Fremont High School in Los Angeles and California State University, Los Angeles. Davis attended high school with future professional baseball players Leon McFadden, Willie Crawford, Bobby Tolan and Bob Watson.

Davis made his big league debut at age 19 with the Houston Colt .45s on April 9, 1963. He appeared in 34 games during the 1963 season (including the September 27 game in which all nine of the Colts starters were rookies) but did not see significant action in the major leagues again until 1971, when he played for the Chicago Cubs.

He was traded along with Jim Colborn and Earl Stephenson by the Cubs to the Milwaukee Brewers for outfielder José Cardenal on December 3, 1971. Davis batted .318 in 1972 in a utility role with the Brewers. His final game as a major-leaguer was on October 4, 1972.

All told, in 242 MLB games played, he collected 141 hits, including 12 doubles and five triples, 43 runs batted in. On June 14, 1963, Davis hit the only home run of his major league career, against Jack Sanford of the San Francisco Giants.

References

External links
, or Retrosheet, or Pelota Binaria (Venezuelan Winter League)

1943 births
Living people
African-American baseball players
Amarillo Sonics players
Baseball players from Oakland, California
Cardenales de Lara players
American expatriate baseball players in Venezuela
Chicago Cubs players
Dallas–Fort Worth Spurs players
Evansville Triplets players
John C. Fremont High School alumni
Hawaii Islanders players
Houston Astros players
Houston Colt .45s players
Major League Baseball outfielders
Midland Cubs players
Milwaukee Brewers players
Oklahoma City 89ers players
San Antonio Brewers players
San Antonio Bullets players
San Antonio Missions players
Tacoma Cubs players
21st-century African-American people
20th-century African-American sportspeople